Ambia prolalis is a moth in the family Crambidae. It was described by Viette in 1958. It is found on the Comoros (Grande Comore).

References

Moths described in 1958
Musotiminae
Moths of Africa